This is a list of musical ensembles from the Indian metropolitan area of Delhi.

 Euphoria rock band
 Indian Ocean rock band
 Menwhopause rock band
 Musafir rock band
 Parikrama rock-and-roll band
 Them Clones rock band

See also

 Lists of musicians
 Music of India

References

 
Delhi-related lists
India music-related lists
 
Delhi
Lists of organisations based in India